Green Block, also known as the Smith Frye Building, is a historic commercial building located in Elkhart, Elkhart County, Indiana.  It was built in 1895, and is a two-story, eclectic Italianate style brick commercial building.  It features projecting pressed metal bays above each storefront and at the corners and arched second story openings with balconies.

It was added to the National Register of Historic Places in 1980. It is located in the Elkhart Downtown Commercial Historic District.

References

Commercial buildings on the National Register of Historic Places in Indiana
Italianate architecture in Indiana
Commercial buildings completed in 1895
Buildings and structures in Elkhart, Indiana
National Register of Historic Places in Elkhart County, Indiana
1895 establishments in Indiana
Historic district contributing properties in Indiana